Seán O'Meara is an Irish retired hurler who played as a midfielder for the Offaly senior team.

Born in Shinrone, County Offaly, O'Meara first played competitive hurling in his youth. He made his senior debut with Offaly during the 1980-81 National League and immediately became a regular member of the team. During his career O'Meara won a set of All-Ireland and Leinster medals as a non-playing substitute.

At club level O'Meara played with Shinrone.

His retirement came following the conclusion of the 1981 championship.

Honours

Team

Offaly
All-Ireland Senior Hurling Championship (1): 1981 (sub)
Leinster Senior Hurling Championship (5): 1981 (sub)

References

Living people
Offaly inter-county hurlers
Shinrone hurlers
Year of birth missing (living people)